The Abbot Constantine (French: L'abbé Constantin) is a 1933 French comedy film directed by Jean-Paul Paulin and starring Léon Belières, Françoise Rosay and Claude Dauphin. It is based on the novel The Abbot Constantine by Ludovic Halévy. The novel had previously been made into a 1925 silent film of the same title.

Cast
 Léon Belières as L'abbé Constantin  
 Françoise Rosay as La comtesse de Laverdens  
 Claude Dauphin as Paul de Laverdens  
 Betty Stockfeld as Mrs. Scott  
 Jean Martinelli as Jean Reynaud  
 Josseline Gaël as Bettina Perceval  
 Pauline Carton as Pauline  
 Robert Moor as Comte de Larnac  
 Anthony Gildès as Le créancier 
 Marcel Barnault 
 George André Martin

References

Bibliography 
 Goble, Alan. The Complete Index to Literary Sources in Film. Walter de Gruyter, 1999.

External links 
 
L'Abbé Constantin on Ciné-Ressources

1933 films
French comedy films
1933 comedy films
1930s French-language films
Films directed by Jean-Paul Paulin
Films scored by Michel Michelet
Remakes of French films
Sound film remakes of silent films
French black-and-white films
1930s French films